Redemption is a lost 1917 American silent drama film starring Evelyn Nesbit. It was co-directed by Joseph A. Golden and Julius Steiger. The story depicted in the film has strong similarities to Nesbit's own scandalous public life. Nesbit's young son Russell Thaw co-stars with her.

Cast
 Evelyn Nesbit as Alice Loring (credited as Evelyn Nesbit Thaw)
 Russell Thaw as Harry Loring
 Charles Wellesley as Stephen Brooks (credited as Charles Wellsley)
 Mary Hall as Brooks's wife
 William Clark as Robert, Their Son (credited as William Clarke)
 Joyce Fair as Grace, Their Daughter
 Edward Lynch as Thomas Loring
 George Clarke as Harry (15 years later)
 Marie Reichardt as Mrs. Collins

References

External links

 
 
 lithograph poster
  lobby card

1917 films
1917 drama films
1917 lost films
American silent feature films
American black-and-white films
Silent American drama films
Films directed by Joseph A. Golden
Lost American films
Lost drama films
1910s American films